Aset or ASET may refer to:

ASET (education), an awarding body
Association of Science and Engineering Technology Professionals of Alberta (ASET) for technicians and technologists in Alberta, Canada
ASET (professional body), an educational charity for placement and employability professionals in the United Kingdom
ASET (All Size Equipment Transport), a South Australian-based company focused on the specialist transportation of over-dimensional equipment and machinery.

See also
Asset (disambiguation)
Isis, Aset being the Egyptian name for the goddess 
Iset (disambiguation), page for Egyptian name